Agios Theodoros is a village of the Voio municipality. Before the 2011 local government reform it was part of the municipality of Tsotyli. The 2011 census recorded 34 inhabitants in the village.

See also
List of settlements in the Kozani regional unit

References

Populated places in Kozani (regional unit)